Utility Warehouse is a multiservice provider based in London, England that uses multi-level marketing to obtain customers through independent distributors. It is a brand name of its parent company, Telecom Plus. It currently handles over 814,000 customer accounts with the help of over 45,000 independent distributors. Utility Warehouse supplies customers with landline telephony, mobile telephony, broadband, gas, and electricity. The Utility Warehouse brand is the primary engine of revenue generation for Telecom Plus.

History
Telecom Plus, a FTSE 250 company, established Utility Warehouse in 2002 as a subsidiary and brand to encompass all of their residential energy, telephony and broadband offerings. The Utility Warehouse headquarters is in Colindale, North London.

In 2006, UW and Telecom Plus entered into an agreement with npower, under which npower would supply energy (gas and electricity) to UW customers. UW sold its two subsidiaries (Electricity Plus and Gas Plus) to npower. A 2009 article by The Guardian reported that Telecom Plus's rates were generally average, and as much as 20% higher than the best deals.

In 2013, however, npower sold the two former Telecom Plus subsidiaries back to Utility Warehouse for £218 million. As a result, Utility Warehouse became one of the largest independent energy suppliers in the UK. The deal sparked commentary about the possibility of npower's parent company RWE leaving the UK, or the emergence of a "Big Seven" in place of the existing Big Six energy suppliers.

In 2021, UW agreed to pay £1.5million into Ofgem's redress fund, after an investigation begun by Ofgem in 2018 found that since 2013 the company had not given sufficient support to customers in payment difficulties.

Products 
The company supplies gas, electricity, broadband, mobile and landline telephony, home insurance and a cashback card. Their telephony and energy services are often bundled to reduce costs for customers.

Business model
Utility Warehouse employs a multi-level marketing model that utilizes independent distributors to obtain new customers. Distributors introduce both residential and business customers.

Utility Warehouse has no shops and does not advertise on television or in the national press. The company uses word-of-mouth as a primary means of promotion, and offers bonuses to distributors who recruit new customers and distributors.

Distributors gain a commission from their own customers and their distributor's customers, making Telecom Plus a multi-level marketing company. There is a joining cost to become a distributor (reduced if they become, or already are a customer). A 2017 Guardian investigation found that total commission paid to distributors in the previous financial year was £21.1 million, or less than 3% of revenue; if that amount was divided equally among the 41,717 distributors they would each receive £505 per year. Utility Warehouse responded that the calculation was misleading: "there are many who for whatever reason earn considerably less than £500 per year, and there are those who work at their business extremely hard and earn considerably more than this". In 2019, the average distributor earned £12 a week, prior to taking costs into consideration.

References

External links

Utility Warehouse customer satisfaction survey results – Which?
Utility Warehouse for Business

Companies established in 2002
Companies based in the London Borough of Barnet
Internet service providers of the United Kingdom
Electric power companies of England